Polerovirus is a genus of viruses, in the family Solemoviridae. Plants serve as natural hosts. There are 26 species in this genus. Diseases associated with this genus include: PLRV causes prominent rolling of the leaves of potato and a stiff upright habit of the plants; necrosis of the phloem and accumulation of carbohydrates in the leaves.

Taxonomy
The following species are recognized:

 Beet chlorosis virus
 Beet mild yellowing virus
 Beet western yellows virus
 Carrot red leaf virus
 Cereal yellow dwarf virus RPS
 Cereal yellow dwarf virus RPV
 Chickpea chlorotic stunt virus
 Cotton leafroll dwarf virus
 Cucurbit aphid-borne yellows virus
 Faba bean polerovirus 1
 Maize yellow dwarf virus RMV
 Maize yellow mosaic virus
 Melon aphid-borne yellows virus
 Pepo aphid-borne mosaic virus
 Pepper vein yellows virus 1
 Pepper vein yellows virus 2
 Pepper vein yellows virus 3
 Pepper vein yellows virus 4
 Pepper vein yellows virus 5
 Pepper vein yellows virus 6
 Potato leafroll virus
 Pumpkin polerovirus
 Suakwa aphid-borne yellows virus
 Sugarcane yellow leaf virus
 Tobacco vein distorting virus
 Turnip yellows virus

Structure
Viruses in Polerovirus are non-enveloped, with icosahedral and  Spherical geometries, and T=3 symmetry. The diameter is around 23 nm. Genomes are linear and non-segmented, around 5.3-5.7kb in length.

Life cycle
Viral replication is cytoplasmic. Entry into the host cell is achieved by penetration into the host cell. Replication follows the positive stranded RNA virus replication model. Positive stranded RNA virus transcription is the method of transcription. Translation takes place by leaky scanning, −1 ribosomal frameshifting, and suppression of termination. The virus exits the host cell by tubule-guided viral movement. Plants serve as the natural host. The virus is transmitted via a vector (plrv: myzus persicae). Transmission routes are vector and mechanical.

References

External links

 Viralzone: Polerovirus
 ICTV

Virus genera